= Work and Socialism Party =

Somali political party

- Founded: 1960
- Dissolved: 1969
- Headquarters: Somalia
- Ideology: Socialism; Marxism

The Work and Socialism Party (Somali: Hawl iyo Hantiwadaag) was a small leftist party in Somalia. It was founded by Abdulaziz Nuur Hersi, a lawyer educated Egypt and Italy. Some of its leading members were appointed to high posts by the military regime.

== Sources ==
- Laitin, David D.; Said S. Samatar (1987). Somalia: Nation in Search of a State. Boulder, Colo.: Westview Press. ISBN 0-86531-555-8.
